Märt is an Estonian masculine given name, a version of Martin.

People named Märt include:
Märt Avandi (born 1981), actor
Märt Israel (born 1983), discus thrower
, actor
Märt Kermon (born 1940), basketball player and basketball coach
Märt Kosemets (born 1981), football player
Märt Kubo (born 1944), theatre pedagogue, critic and politician
 (born 1962), sinologist
Märt-Matis Lill (born 1975), composer
Märt Meos (1881–1966), educator and politician
Märt Pius (born 1989), actor
Märt Põder (born 1979), philosopher, freedom of information activist, presenter, publicist and translator
Märt Rask (born 1950), jurist and politician
Märt Ringmaa (1938–2021), convicted bomber
Märt Sults (born 1961), politician
Märt Tiru (1947–2005), Brigadier General
Märt Treier (born 1975), TV and radio journalist (:et)
 (born 1965), literary scientist, critic and translator
Märt Visnapuu (born 1962), actor

Estonian masculine given names